Juan Sebastian Cruz Vitagliano (born 5 June 1980 in Argentina) is an Argentinean retired footballer.

Career

At the age of 19, Vitagliano moved to Italy, where he played in the lower divisions before signing with Slovenian side Koper in 2001.

In 2004/05, he played for NK Olimpija Ljubljana. However, the club was dissolved at the end of 2005 due to financial problems.

Vitagliano has compared his style of play to that of Argentina international Matías Almeyda.

References

External links
 

Argentine footballers
Living people
1980 births
Association football midfielders
FC Koper players
NK Olimpija Ljubljana (1945–2005) players
Expatriate footballers in Slovenia